The Miles M.18 was a single-engine twin-seat low-winged light British civil utility aircraft of the 1930s.

Development
The Miles M.18 was a series of three slightly different prototype aircraft.

Variants
The M.18 Mk.1 was a two-seat tandem training aircraft, powered by a 130 h.p. de Havilland Gipsy Major which was first flown on 4 December 1938 from Woodley Aerodrome near Reading by F.G. Miles. The sole example G-AFRO was converted to a single seater in 1941, with a fixed tricycle undercarriage and with the fin and rudder moved forward by 22 in.  It later reverted to a tail wheel undercarriage layout and flew during 1946-1947 with its span reduced from 31 ft 0 in to 22 ft 0 in and a 110 h.p. Jameson FF engine was installed. It was scrapped in December 1947.

The M.18 Mk.2 had the fin and rudder moved forward by 22 in and was fitted with a 150 h.p. Blackburn Cirrus Major III. The sole example, serial HM545, first flew at Woodley in November 1939.  It was evaluated by the Air Ministry as a possible replacement for the Miles Magister. According to test pilots, it handled better than the Magister, was impossible to spin and flew well at night. However the Mk.2 was regarded as lacking robustness.
The Mk.2 was used through the Second World War as a communications aircraft by Miles Aircraft.  It was civilianised as G-AHKY and won the Goodyear Trophy air race in 1956 at 130 mph and the Kings Cup Air Race in 1961 at 142 mph.  After ownership by several private pilots, it was retired in 1989 and from 1996 to date, the aircraft has been on display at the  National Museum of Flight in Scotland. 
 
The M.18 Mk.3 was fitted with enclosed tandem cockpits and powered by one 150 h.p. Blackburn Cirrus III. The sole aircraft, U-0236, first flew at Woodley in October 1942.  It was used by Miles for wartime communications as JN703, before civil sale as G-AHOA in 1946.  It had two private owners before crashing at Littondale, Yorkshire on 25 May 1950.

Specifications (M.18 Mk.2)

References

Notes

Bibliography

1930s British civil utility aircraft
M.18
Single-engined tractor aircraft
Low-wing aircraft
Aircraft first flown in 1938